Adwa' Al Shohra ( - lit. "lights of fame"), also known as The Limelight, is an album by the Lebanese singer Carole Samaha released in 2006.

Carole dedicated this album to Mansour Rahbani.

Track listing

References 

Carole Samaha albums
2006 albums